The Braille pattern dots-34 is a 6-dot braille cell with the top right and bottom left dots raised, or an 8-dot braille cell with the top right and lower-middle dots raised. It is represented by the Unicode code point U+280c, and in Braille ASCII with the slash: /.

Unified Braille

In unified international braille, the braille pattern dots-34 is used to represent a front, open to close diphthong, i.e. /ai/, or otherwise assigned as needed.

Table of unified braille values

Other braille

Plus dots 7 and 8

Related to Braille pattern dots-34 are Braille patterns 347, 348, and 3478, which are used in 8-dot braille systems, such as Gardner-Salinas and Luxembourgish Braille.

Related 8-dot kantenji patterns

In the Japanese kantenji braille, the standard 8-dot Braille patterns 57, 157, 457, and 1457 are the patterns related to Braille pattern dots-34, since the two additional dots of kantenji patterns 034, 347, and 0347 are placed above the base 6-dot cell, instead of below, as in standard 8-dot braille.

Kantenji using braille patterns 57, 157, 457, or 1457

This listing includes kantenji using Braille pattern dots-34 for all 6349 kanji found in JIS C 6226-1978.

  - 病

Variants and thematic compounds

  -  selector 3 + や/疒  =  艮
  -  selector 4 + や/疒  =  乎
  -  selector 5 + や/疒  =  豈
  -  selector 6 + selector 6 + や/疒  =  鬯
  -  や/疒 + selector 1  =  山
  -  や/疒 + selector 2  =  矢
  -  や/疒 + selector 5  = - 疾
  -  比 + や/疒  =  良

Compounds of 病 and 疒

  -  や/疒 + の/禾  =  疫
  -  や/疒 + ひ/辶  =  疲
  -  や/疒 + い/糹/#2  =  症
  -  や/疒 + そ/馬  =  痒
  -  や/疒 + そ/馬 + や/疒  =  癢
  -  や/疒 + し/巿  =  痔
  -  や/疒 + と/戸  =  痘
  -  や/疒 + つ/土  =  痛
  -  や/疒 + ぬ/力  =  痢
  -  や/疒 + え/訁  =  痩
  -  や/疒 + 数  =  瘍
  -  や/疒 + ろ/十  =  療
  -  や/疒 + 囗  =  癌
  -  や/疒 + ゆ/彳  =  癒
  -  や/疒 + や/疒 + ゆ/彳  =  瘉
  -  や/疒 + ま/石  =  癖
  -  や/疒 + 数 + て/扌  =  疔
  -  や/疒 + す/発 + selector 4  =  疚
  -  や/疒 + 宿 + 仁/亻  =  疣
  -  や/疒 + 仁/亻 + 宿  =  疥
  -  や/疒 + も/門 + selector 2  =  疱
  -  や/疒 + selector 4 + る/忄  =  疳
  -  や/疒 + 比 + selector 4  =  疵
  -  や/疒 + selector 4 + 日  =  疸
  -  や/疒 + 宿 + う/宀/#3  =  疹
  -  や/疒 + す/発 + selector 1  =  疼
  -  や/疒 + 宿 + そ/馬  =  疽
  -  や/疒 + ぬ/力 + れ/口  =  痂
  -  や/疒 + 龸 + ゐ/幺  =  痃
  -  や/疒 + り/分 + へ/⺩  =  痊
  -  や/疒 + ゆ/彳 + な/亻  =  痍
  -  や/疒 + 宿 + け/犬  =  痙
  -  や/疒 + ふ/女 + 囗  =  痞
  -  や/疒 + つ/土 + 心  =  痣
  -  や/疒 + 火 + 火  =  痰
  -  や/疒 + 心 + ま/石  =  痲
  -  や/疒 + き/木 + き/木  =  痳
  -  や/疒 + た/⽥ + さ/阝  =  痺
  -  や/疒 + 囗 + ろ/十  =  痼
  -  や/疒 + さ/阝 + か/金  =  痾
  -  や/疒 + 宿 + ふ/女  =  痿
  -  や/疒 + お/頁 + ろ/十  =  瘁
  -  や/疒 + む/車 + 宿  =  瘋
  -  や/疒 + 宿 + ⺼  =  瘟
  -  や/疒 + ⺼ + 仁/亻  =  瘠
  -  や/疒 + り/分 + お/頁  =  瘡
  -  や/疒 + ふ/女 + の/禾  =  瘢
  -  や/疒 + ら/月 + た/⽥  =  瘤
  -  や/疒 + す/発 + か/金  =  瘧
  -  や/疒 + た/⽥ + ゐ/幺  =  瘰
  -  や/疒 + ま/石 + ろ/十  =  瘴
  -  や/疒 + 宿 + る/忄  =  瘻
  -  や/疒 + 龸 + ぬ/力  =  癆
  -  や/疒 + も/門 + ら/月  =  癇
  -  や/疒 + 宿 + す/発  =  癈
  -  や/疒 + 数 + ま/石  =  癘
  -  や/疒 + こ/子 + の/禾  =  癜
  -  や/疒 + 宿 + よ/广  =  癡
  -  や/疒 + こ/子 + ん/止  =  癧
  -  や/疒 + ち/竹 + selector 1  =  癨
  -  や/疒 + お/頁 + 数  =  癩
  -  や/疒 + の/禾 + を/貝  =  癪
  -  や/疒 + せ/食 + そ/馬  =  癬
  -  や/疒 + 囗 + ひ/辶  =  癰
  -  や/疒 + selector 1 + め/目  =  癲

Compounds of 艮

  -  る/忄 + や/疒  =  恨
  -  き/木 + や/疒  =  根
  -  き/木 + や/疒 + れ/口  =  椥
  -  龸 + や/疒  =  爵
  -  れ/口 + 龸 + や/疒  =  嚼
  -  め/目 + や/疒  =  眼
  -  ひ/辶 + や/疒  =  退
  -  ⺼ + ひ/辶 + や/疒  =  腿
  -  ね/示 + ひ/辶 + や/疒  =  褪
  -  ゐ/幺 + や/疒  =  郷
  -  囗 + ゐ/幺 + や/疒  =  嚮
  -  か/金 + や/疒  =  銀
  -  さ/阝 + や/疒  =  限
  -  や/疒 + ち/竹  =  墾
  -  や/疒 + 心  =  懇
  -  や/疒 + 仁/亻  =  既
  -  よ/广 + や/疒 + 仁/亻  =  廐
  -  日 + や/疒 + 仁/亻  =  曁
  -  け/犬 + selector 3 + や/疒  =  狠
  -  み/耳 + selector 3 + や/疒  =  跟
  -  つ/土 + 宿 + や/疒  =  垠
  -  ゆ/彳 + 宿 + や/疒  =  很
  -  や/疒 + 宿 + や/疒  =  痕
  -  く/艹 + 宿 + や/疒  =  艱
  -  や/疒 + ん/止 + の/禾  =  齦

Compounds of 乎

  -  れ/口 + や/疒  =  呼

Compounds of 豈

  -  や/疒 + 龸  =  凱
  -  心 + selector 5 + や/疒  =  榿
  -  ま/石 + selector 5 + や/疒  =  磑
  -  ぬ/力 + 宿 + や/疒  =  剴
  -  や/疒 + 日 + selector 1  =  皚
  -  や/疒 + め/目 + 宿  =  覬
  -  か/金 + 宿 + や/疒  =  鎧

Compounds of 山

  -  う/宀/#3 + や/疒  =  密
  -  心 + う/宀/#3 + や/疒  =  樒
  -  ま/石 + や/疒  =  岩
  -  く/艹 + や/疒  =  岳
  -  せ/食 + や/疒  =  島
  -  て/扌 + せ/食 + や/疒  =  搗
  -  き/木 + せ/食 + や/疒  =  槝
  -  ゆ/彳 + や/疒  =  徴
  -  い/糹/#2 + や/疒  =  繃
  -  は/辶 + や/疒  =  辿
  -  や/疒 + は/辶  =  岐
  -  や/疒 + こ/子  =  岬
  -  や/疒 + か/金  =  岸
  -  や/疒 + う/宀/#3  =  峠
  -  や/疒 + な/亻  =  峡
  -  や/疒 + や/疒 + な/亻  =  峽
  -  や/疒 + ほ/方  =  峰
  -  や/疒 + ね/示  =  崇
  -  や/疒 + け/犬  =  崎
  -  や/疒 + ら/月  =  崩
  -  や/疒 + ん/止  =  嵌
  -  や/疒 + む/車  =  嵐
  -  や/疒 + り/分  =  嶮
  -  や/疒 + お/頁  =  嶺
  -  や/疒 + ゑ/訁  =  嶽
  -  や/疒 + 氷/氵  =  巌
  -  や/疒 + や/疒 + 氷/氵  =  巖
  -  や/疒 + 火  =  炭
  -  仁/亻 + や/疒 + selector 1  =  仙
  -  つ/土 + や/疒 + selector 1  =  圸
  -  て/扌 + や/疒 + selector 1  =  攜
  -  き/木 + や/疒 + selector 1  =  杣
  -  に/氵 + や/疒 + selector 1  =  汕
  -  や/疒 + や/疒 + selector 1  =  疝
  -  も/門 + や/疒 + selector 1  =  閊
  -  や/疒 + selector 1 + ん/止  =  岻
  -  や/疒 + 数 + を/貝  =  乢
  -  や/疒 + う/宀/#3 + ふ/女  =  妛
  -  や/疒 + selector 4 + ぬ/力  =  屶
  -  や/疒 + 龸 + お/頁  =  屹
  -  や/疒 + selector 4 + ゐ/幺  =  岌
  -  や/疒 + り/分 + selector 1  =  岑
  -  や/疒 + う/宀/#3 + り/分  =  岔
  -  や/疒 + selector 5 + そ/馬  =  岨
  -  や/疒 + た/⽥ + selector 4  =  岫
  -  や/疒 + 仁/亻 + 囗  =  岱
  -  や/疒 + う/宀/#3 + 日  =  岶
  -  や/疒 + み/耳 + ん/止  =  岷
  -  や/疒 + り/分 + か/金  =  岼
  -  や/疒 + れ/口 + と/戸  =  岾
  -  や/疒 + む/車 + と/戸  =  峅
  -  や/疒 + り/分 + 囗  =  峇
  -  や/疒 + つ/土 + し/巿  =  峙
  -  や/疒 + 囗 + selector 1  =  峨
  -  や/疒 + 宿 + 囗  =  峩
  -  や/疒 + た/⽥ + selector 1  =  峪
  -  や/疒 + そ/馬 + ⺼  =  峭
  -  や/疒 + 宿 + ほ/方  =  峯
  -  や/疒 + 日 + な/亻  =  峺
  -  や/疒 + う/宀/#3 + む/車  =  峻
  -  や/疒 + う/宀/#3 + か/金  =  崋
  -  や/疒 + う/宀/#3 + 比  =  崑
  -  や/疒 + う/宀/#3 + い/糹/#2  =  崔
  -  や/疒 + 龸 + つ/土  =  崕
  -  や/疒 + う/宀/#3 + つ/土  =  崖
  -  や/疒 + 囗 + ゆ/彳  =  崗
  -  や/疒 + 龸 + る/忄  =  崘
  -  や/疒 + う/宀/#3 + る/忄  =  崙
  -  や/疒 + う/宀/#3 + す/発  =  崚
  -  や/疒 + と/戸 + へ/⺩  =  崛
  -  や/疒 + 宿 + か/金  =  崟
  -  や/疒 + そ/馬 + 宿  =  崢
  -  や/疒 + め/目 + せ/食  =  嵋
  -  や/疒 + う/宀/#3 + く/艹  =  嵎
  -  や/疒 + れ/口 + う/宀/#3  =  嵒
  -  や/疒 + う/宀/#3 + け/犬  =  嵜
  -  や/疒 + 比 + え/訁  =  嵩
  -  や/疒 + お/頁 + に/氵  =  嵬
  -  や/疒 + そ/馬 + こ/子  =  嵯
  -  や/疒 + う/宀/#3 + そ/馬  =  嵳
  -  や/疒 + ゆ/彳 + ゆ/彳  =  嵶
  -  や/疒 + う/宀/#3 + ま/石  =  嶂
  -  や/疒 + む/車 + を/貝  =  嶄
  -  や/疒 + も/門 + selector 3  =  嶇
  -  や/疒 + せ/食 + selector 1  =  嶋
  -  や/疒 + う/宀/#3 + せ/食  =  嶌
  -  や/疒 + さ/阝 + せ/食  =  嶐
  -  や/疒 + す/発 + と/戸  =  嶝
  -  や/疒 + 宿 + つ/土  =  嶢
  -  や/疒 + そ/馬 + 囗  =  嶬
  -  や/疒 + 宿 + selector 4  =  嶼
  -  や/疒 + ぬ/力 + 宿  =  巉
  -  や/疒 + う/宀/#3 + お/頁  =  巍
  -  や/疒 + う/宀/#3 + え/訁  =  巒
  -  や/疒 + お/頁 + て/扌  =  巓
  -  に/氵 + 宿 + や/疒  =  澂
  -  む/車 + 宿 + や/疒  =  蚩

Compounds of 矢

  -  や/疒 + れ/口  =  知
  -  や/疒 + や/疒  =  痴
  -  や/疒 + 日  =  智
  -  み/耳 + や/疒 + れ/口  =  聟
  -  む/車 + や/疒 + れ/口  =  蜘
  -  仁/亻 + や/疒  =  侯
  -  け/犬 + 仁/亻 + や/疒  =  猴
  -  ち/竹 + 仁/亻 + や/疒  =  篌
  -  な/亻 + や/疒  =  候
  -  も/門 + や/疒  =  医
  -  も/門 + も/門 + や/疒  =  醫
  -  む/車 + や/疒  =  挨
  -  ほ/方 + や/疒  =  族
  -  れ/口 + ほ/方 + や/疒  =  嗾
  -  ち/竹 + ほ/方 + や/疒  =  簇
  -  く/艹 + ほ/方 + や/疒  =  蔟
  -  か/金 + ほ/方 + や/疒  =  鏃
  -  と/戸 + や/疒  =  短
  -  や/疒 + よ/广  =  疑
  -  氷/氵 + や/疒  =  凝
  -  て/扌 + や/疒  =  擬
  -  や/疒 + や/疒 + よ/广  =  嶷
  -  ま/石 + や/疒 + よ/广  =  礙
  -  や/疒 + す/発  =  矩
  -  ち/竹 + や/疒 + selector 2  =  笶
  -  く/艹 + や/疒 + selector 2  =  薙
  -  や/疒 + ゆ/彳 + selector 4  =  矧
  -  や/疒 + の/禾 + ふ/女  =  矮
  -  や/疒 + 宿 + の/禾  =  矯
  -  や/疒 + selector 3 + ふ/女  =  肄
  -  み/耳 + 宿 + や/疒  =  踟
  -  や/疒 + 宿 + せ/食  =  雉

Compounds of 疾

  -  ふ/女 + や/疒 + selector 5  =  嫉

Compounds of 良

  -  ふ/女 + や/疒  =  娘
  -  や/疒 + さ/阝  =  郎
  -  よ/广 + や/疒  =  廊
  -  心 + や/疒 + さ/阝  =  榔
  -  へ/⺩ + や/疒 + さ/阝  =  瑯
  -  む/車 + や/疒 + さ/阝  =  螂
  -  ら/月 + や/疒  =  朗
  -  に/氵 + や/疒  =  浪
  -  け/犬 + や/疒  =  狼
  -  そ/馬 + や/疒  =  養
  -  に/氵 + そ/馬 + や/疒  =  瀁
  -  せ/食 + そ/馬 + や/疒  =  鱶
  -  ら/月 + 比 + や/疒  =  朖
  -  へ/⺩ + 比 + や/疒  =  琅
  -  の/禾 + 比 + や/疒  =  粮
  -  心 + 比 + や/疒  =  莨
  -  み/耳 + 比 + や/疒  =  踉

Other compounds

  -  ち/竹 + や/疒  =  爺
  -  日 + や/疒  =  曜
  -  み/耳 + や/疒  =  躍
  -  や/疒 + に/氵  =  濯
  -  や/疒 + selector 4 + 囗  =  戳
  -  て/扌 + 宿 + や/疒  =  擢
  -  き/木 + 宿 + や/疒  =  櫂
  -  火 + 宿 + や/疒  =  燿
  -  龸 + 宿 + や/疒  =  耀
  -  き/木 + 龸 + や/疒  =  梍

Notes

Braille patterns